Franklin Springs is a city in Franklin County, Georgia, United States. The population was 952 at the 2010 census, up from 762 in 2000. Emmanuel College is located here.

History
Franklin Springs began in the 19th century as a resort spa, with the city incorporating in 1924. 

The Franklin Springs Institute opened there in 1919 as a high school, eventually shifting to postsecondary education and changing its name to Emmanuel College in 1939.

On September 16, 2004 a magnitude 2 tornado moved north across the town of Franklin Springs, damaging or destroying numerous structures along its 3-mile path.)The city government building and the fire and police stations incurred significant damage, as did approximately 25 residences. Franklin County Emergency Management reported 10 chicken houses, some housing as many as 30,000 chickens and valued at more than $100,000 each, were destroyed. This was part of the Hurricane Ivan tornado outbreak.

Geography
Franklin Springs is located in southeastern Franklin County at  (34.284598, -83.143402). It is bordered to the east by Royston. U.S. Route 29 passes through the center of the city, leading east  to the center of Royston and southwest  to Athens.

Demographics

As of the census of 2000, there were 762 people, 208 households, and 133 families residing in the city. The racial makeup of the city was 89.90% White, 6.82% African American, 1.71% Asian, 0.92% from other races, and 0.66% from two or more races. Hispanic or Latino of any race were 1.44% of the population.

There were 208 households, out of which 23.1% had children under the age of 18 living with them, 58.2% were married couples living together, 4.3% had a female householder with no husband present, and 35.6% were non-families. 30.3% of all households were made up of individuals, and 16.8% had someone living alone who was 65 years of age or older. The average household size was 2.34 and the average family size was 2.93.

In the city, the population was spread out, with 11.2% under the age of 18, 44.1% from 18 to 24, 13.3% from 25 to 44, 16.5% from 45 to 64, and 15.0% who were 65 years of age or older. The median age was 22 years. For every 100 females, there were 76.0 males. For every 100 females age 18 and over, there were 75.8 males.

The median income for a household in the city was $45,714, and the median income for a family was $61,500. Males had a median income of $30,156 versus $24,792 for females. The per capita income for the city was $15,321. None of the families and 3.9% of the population were living below the poverty line, including no under eighteens and 8.2% of those over 64.

References

External links

 Franklin Springs historical marker
 The Franklin Springs historical marker

Cities in Georgia (U.S. state)
Cities in Franklin County, Georgia
Tornado outbreaks